Red River series was written and illustrated by Chie Shinohara. Its chapters were serialized in the bimonthly manga anthology Shōjo Comic from January 5, 1995 to June 5, 2002. They were then collected and published in 28 tankōbon volumes by Shogakukan, and later republished in 16 bunkobon volumes. The manga is licensed in North America by Viz Media.



Volume list

References

External links
 Viz Media official website

Red River